Phumlani Nodikida (born 4 December 1978) is a South African rugby union player.

References

South African rugby union players
Living people
1978 births
Rugby union props
Rugby union players from the Eastern Cape
Eastern Province Elephants players